Oryn Keeley (born 13 January 2003) is an Australian professional rugby league footballer who currently plays for the Newcastle Knights in the National Rugby League.

Background
Born in Gosford, New South Wales, Keeley played his junior rugby league for the Northern Lakes Warriors, before being signed by the Newcastle Knights.

Playing career

Early years
Keeley rose through the ranks for the Knights, playing with their Harold Matthews Cup team in 2019 and the S. G. Ball Cup side from 2020 to 2022.

2022
In 2022, Keeley played for the Knights' Jersey Flegg Cup team and represented the New South Wales under-19s team. In round 23 of the 2022 NRL season, he made his NRL debut for the Knights against the Canberra Raiders, in the Knights' 22-28 loss at McDonald Jones Stadium.

References

External links
Newcastle Knights profile

2003 births
Australian rugby league players
Newcastle Knights players
Rugby league second-rows
Rugby league players from Gosford, New South Wales
Living people